Phineas Newborn Jr. (December 14, 1931 – May 26, 1989) was an American jazz pianist, whose principal influences were Art Tatum, Oscar Peterson, and Bud Powell.

Biography
Newborn was born in Whiteville, Tennessee, and came from a musical family: his father, Phineas Newborn Sr., was a drummer in blues bands, and his younger brother, Calvin, a jazz guitarist.  He studied piano as well as trumpet, and tenor and baritone saxophone.

Before moving on to work with Lionel Hampton, Charles Mingus, and others, Newborn first played in an R&B band led by his father on drums, with his brother Calvin on guitar, Tuff Green on bass, Ben Branch and future Hi Records star Willie Mitchell. The group was the house band at the now famous Plantation Inn Club in West Memphis, Arkansas, from 1947 to 1951, and recorded as B. B. King's band on his first recordings in 1949, as well as the Sun Records sessions in 1950. They left West Memphis in 1951 to tour with Jackie Brenston as the "Delta Cats" in support of the record "Rocket 88", recorded by Sam Phillips and considered by many to be the first ever rock & roll record (it was the first Billboard No. 1 record for Chess Records).

Among his earliest recordings, from the early 1950s, are those for Sun Records with blues harmonica player Big Walter Horton.

From 1956, Newborn began to perform in New York City, recording his first album as a leader in that year, Here Is Phineas for Atlantic Records. His trios and quartets at that time included his brother Calvin on guitar, bassists Oscar Pettiford, George Joyner and drummers Kenny Clarke and Philly Joe Jones.  Newborn created enough interest internationally to work as a solo pianist in Stockholm in 1958 and in Rome the following year. He drew much critical acclaim, for both his leonine technique and meticulously artful playing at any tempo. The most often-noted feature of Newborn's playing is fast-tempo parallel improvisation, two octaves apart in the manner of Oscar Peterson, a method involving intense ambidexterity.

On March 16, 1960, 29-year-old Newborn replaced Thelonious Monk and performed "It's All Right with Me" on the ABC-TV series Music for a Spring Night. Newborn moved to Los Angeles that year, and recorded a sequence of piano trio albums for the Contemporary label. Critics often noted his playing style as being too technical, and Newborn developed emotional problems as a result. He was admitted to the Camarillo State Mental Hospital for some periods, and suffered a nervous breakdown related to conflicts with a record label during his career. Newborn later sustained a hand injury which hindered his playing.

Newborn's later work was intermittent due to ongoing health problems. This is most true of the period from the mid-1960s to mid-1970s when he faded from view, underappreciated and underrecorded. He made a partial comeback in the late 1970s and early 1980s, although this return ultimately failed to benefit his financial situation.  He died in 1989 after the discovery of a growth on his lungs and was buried in Memphis National Cemetery.

Legacy
According to jazz historian Nat Hentoff, Newborn's plight spurred the 1989 founding of the Jazz Foundation of America, a group dedicated to helping with the medical bills and other financial needs of retired jazz greats. In the early 1990s the four-player Contemporary Piano Ensemble was formed by pianists Harold Mabern, James Williams, Mulgrew Miller, and Geoff Keezer to pay tribute to Newborn; it recorded two albums and toured internationally.

Reputation
Despite his setbacks, many of Newborn's records, such as The Great Jazz Piano of Phineas Newborn Jr., Phineas' Rainbow, and Harlem Blues remain highly regarded. Jazz commentator Scott Yanow referred to Newborn as "one of the most technically skilled and brilliant pianists in jazz." Evidence of his technical prowess can be heard on tracks such as "Sometimes I'm Happy", from the album Look Out – Phineas Is Back!, on which Newborn performs extended, complex, and brisk solos with both hands in unison. Leonard Feather said of him, "In his prime, he was one of the three greatest jazz pianists of all time." Oscar Peterson said, "If I had to choose the best all-around pianist of anyone who's followed me chronologically, unequivocally ... I would say Phineas Newborn, Jr."

Discography

As leader/co-leader

As sideman

References

External links

Nat Hentoff on the plight of impoverished jazz musicians

1931 births
1989 deaths
American jazz pianists
American male pianists
Hard bop pianists
Mainstream jazz pianists
RCA Victor artists
People from Whiteville, Tennessee
20th-century American pianists
Jazz musicians from Tennessee
20th-century American male musicians
American male jazz musicians
EmArcy Records artists